Habibollah Peyman (born 1935) is an Iranian politician. He is the founder and the leader of an Islamist Socialist political party, named Jonbesh Moslamanan Mobarez, which is banned by the religious government of Iran. He is also one of the leaders of the influential Iranian opposition political alliance, the Nationalist-Religious Forces. This is a group of politicians, academic thinkers (such as Ezzatollah Sahabi, Yousefi Eshkevari and Ebrahim Yazdi) and some parties, who are known to believe in Islamic studies and nationalist interests at the same time.

Although he fought against the pre-revolution government of the Shah, Peyman has spent some years in prison for spreading his political ideas, and especially because of his involvement in the nationalist-religious movement, in the Islamic Republic era too.

He has couple of published articles and books, on political issues, theoretical debates over human's freedom in Quran and Islam, Socialism and Islamic ideology. He and his party might be considered as the left-wing of the nationalist-religious movement in Iran.

Sources
 http://www.mellimazhabi.org/biography/payman/payman.htm

1935 births
Iranian religious-nationalists
Living people
People from Shiraz
Iranian revolutionaries
People of the Iranian Revolution
JAMA (political party) politicians
Movement of Militant Muslims politicians
Council of the Islamic Revolution members
National Front (Iran) student activists
Iran Party politicians
Party of the Iranian People politicians
Movement of God-Worshipping Socialists politicians
Members of the Iranian Committee for the Defense of Freedom and Human Rights
Members of the National Council for Peace
Muslim socialists